Israel Democracy Institute (IDI), established in 1991, is an independent center of research and action dedicated to strengthening the foundations of Israeli democracy. It is located in Jerusalem, Israel.

History

The Israel Democracy Institute was founded in 1991 by Arye Carmon, the founding president, and Bernard Marcus.

IDI works to bolster the values and institutions of Israel as a Jewish and democratic state. A non-partisan think-and-do tank, the institute harnesses rigorous applied research to influence policy, legislation and public opinion. The institute partners with government, policy and decision makers, civil service and society, to improve the functioning of the government and its institutions, confront security threats while preserving civil liberties, and foster solidarity within Israeli society. Israel recognized the positive impact of IDI's research and recommendations by conferring upon the institute its most prestigious award, the Israel Prize for Lifetime Achievement.

In 2014, Yohanan Plesner was appointed president of the institute.

Structure 
The Israel Democracy Institute contains the following centers:

The Center for Democratic Values and Institutions 
Engages with the core issues of Israeli democracy, and with the erosion in public commitment to substantive democracy and its values. The center focuses on bolstering the commitment of public institutions and decision makers to the protection of human rights, to the principles of freedom and equality, and to the rule of law. The research and implementation work carried out at the center concentrates on failures in implementing the principle of the separation of powers, and on maintaining the independence of the state's structural institutions, including the courts, the Knesset, the government, regulatory bodies, the state prosecutor and the attorney general, local government, and the media.

The Center for Religion, Nation and State 
Addresses the question of how to balance the particularistic Jewish characteristics of the State of Israel (nationality and religion) with its liberal-democratic characteristics. The center is also concerned with renewing the conceptual foundations of Jewish-democratic Zionism for our times, and with the internal and external challenges to the state's Jewish identity. The center's researchers are also engaged in developing ways for Israel's Haredi population to be integrated into the general Israeli economy and society.

The Center for Governance and the Economy 
Promotes reforms to the political system, the civil service, and the labor market in Israel, with the aim of improving the functioning of these systems and increasing public trust in them.

The Center for Security and Democracy 
Maps the challenges for democratic societies posed by the fight against terror, and examines how a balance can be maintained between answering security needs and protecting human rights.

Viterbi Center for Public Opinion and Policy Research 
An independent research center that has operated under the auspices of the Israel Democracy Institute since 1998, engaged in collecting, analyzing, and maintaining empirical data relating to Israeli society and politics. The center's comprehensive survey database contains data from more than a thousand public opinion surveys conducted since 1967 on a range of political, social, and media-related topics. The center is headed by Prof. Tamar Hermann. Among the more noteworthy publications issued by the Guttman Center in recent years are: Religious? National!, a survey of attitudes and behaviors in the national-religious sector in Israel; the annual Israeli Democracy Index; and the monthly Peace Index produced in partnership with Tel-Aviv University. The institute was originally named after Louis Guttman and was renamed in January 2021 after Andrew Viterbi.

Activities

Eli Hurvitz Conference on Economy and Society (formerly the Caesarea Forum) 
The Eli Hurvitz Conference on Economy and Society, run by the Israel Democracy Institute, is Israel's leading economic conference. Since 1993, the conference has served as the meeting place for public discourse and professional knowledge relating to economy and society in Israel. Its main goal is to improve decision-making processes in government, so as to ensure better social and economic policies that will benefit all Israelis.

Israeli Democracy Index 
The Israeli Democracy Index provides an annual assessment of the quality of democracy in Israel. It is prepared on the basis of a large-scale survey conducted every year since 2004 with a representative sample of the Israeli population, comprising around 1,500 interviewees aged 18 and above. The survey is designed to identify trends in Israeli society on substantial issues relating to the fulfillment of democratic values and goals, and to the functioning of government systems and elected officials. The Index contains an analysis of the survey results, and aims to enrich public discourse on the state of democracy in Israel by giving access to a broad database of relevant information.

Alongside this general assessment, the Index also focuses each year on a particular topic connected to Israeli democracy. The subjects chosen so far include: opinions of Israeli youth (2004); the media in Israeli democracy (2005); tenth anniversary of the Rabin assassination (2005); political parties in Israel (2006); cohesion in a fractured society (2007); civil society in Israel (2008); twentieth anniversary of mass immigration from the Soviet Union (2009); democratic principles in Israel in practice (2010); the social protest, a year on (2012); civilian opinions on the socioeconomic situation (2014); the Rabin assassination, twenty years on (2015); and opinions in Haredi society (2016).

Outstanding Parliamentarian Award 
The institute's Outstanding Parliamentarian Award seeks to encourage high-quality parliamentary activity and to recognize those who perform it.

The award is given annually to two Knesset members, one from the governing coalition and one from the opposition, based on a comprehensive review of several fixed criteria used to determine good parliamentary performance. First, a database is created of the activity of all Knesset members (excluding ministers, deputy ministers, the Speaker of the Knesset, and the previous year's winners of the award) across a range of parameters: attendance at committee meetings, private legislation passed during that year's Knesset session, queries submitted, agenda item proposals debated in the plenum, brief and full-length speeches delivered at plenary sessions, commissioning of research studies from the Knesset Research and Information Center, and plenary attendance, as well as reprimands and punishments received from the Knesset Ethics Committee. Next, the award committee, chaired by retired Justice Theodore Orr, convenes to discuss the list of candidates, and selects the honorees based on the data provided as well as on additional criteria, such as the broader public influence and importance of the candidates' parliamentary work.

The Outstanding Parliamentarian Award helps improve both the quality of Knesset members' work and the public perception of the Knesset as Israel's legislative body.

Political and Electoral Reform 
The Forum for Political Reform in Israel was founded by Arye Carmon, driven by "a sense of the need to launch processes that will bring about a significant change in the capabilities and functioning of the parliament in general, and in particular, of those who hold the levers of power," as he described it. The forum was chaired by former Supreme Court President Meir Shamgar, and its members included academics, retired justices, leading public figures, and businesspeople.

The forum examined the expected impact of reforms to the electoral, governmental, and party-political systems proposed by the Israel Democracy Institute, and formulated practical proposals for legislation and public policy accordingly.

In 2015, the Israel Democracy Institute published an updated plan for political and electoral reform, proposing structural changes to the political system that would result in the formation of two major blocks of political parties providing clear alternatives for government.

Parliament online journal 
Parliament is an online journal exploring topics related to governance, law, and society from both local and international perspectives. The first issue was published in print in 1993, and up until 2007 the journal contained articles on such subjects as elections in Israel and around the world, Israeli society, constitution and basic laws, religion and state, security and the armed forces, political participation, political parties, the European Union, and many others. In 2007, the format of the journal was changed so that each issue is dedicated to a single main topic. The journal was also taken online, and is no longer published in a print format.

Human Rights and Judaism Fellowship Program 
This is a unique scholarship program for outstanding doctoral research students in the field of human rights and Judaism, which seeks to create an intellectual foundation for shaping the human rights discourse in a Jewish nation state.

Annual Statistical Report on Ultra-Orthodox Society in Israel 
This is the first publication in Israel to provide a comprehensive anthology of existing quantitative data about Haredi society in Israel. It aims to provide a full and up-to-date picture of Haredi society based on statistical information and data analysis, covering a range of subject areas including demographics, education, welfare, standard of living, employment, voting patterns in Knesset elections, and lifestyles.

The Annual Statistical Report on Ultra-Orthodox Society in Israel is produced by a team of researchers from the Jerusalem Institute for Policy Research and the Israel Democracy Institute.

Legal opinions to the Ministerial Committee on Legislation 
The Ministerial Committee on Legislation is one of Israel's most important ministerial committees. Chaired by the Minister of Justice, it meets weekly to decide the governing coalition's position on all proposed legislation, whether government-sponsored or private members' bills.

Every week, the Israel Democracy Institute submits a legal opinion on the bills being discussed by the committee, which it also shares with relevant Knesset committees. The opinion is written based on the areas of research expertise of the institute's research fellows.

Security Clearance blog 
Security Clearance is an online forum for analyzing issues relating to both national security and democracy. It aims to contribute to the public-academic debate on national security issues from a range of perspectives, including law, ethics, and social sciences.

The blog is edited by researchers at the Israel Democracy Institute, but is open to a diverse range of views, and to writers from a variety of fields related to national security who seek to participate in serious, open, and fruitful discussions. The views expressed on the blog are strictly those of the writers themselves, and do not represent the institutions or organizations to which they belong, or the views of the blog editors or the Israel Democracy Institute.

Elections and Political Parties 
This comparative tool, developed by the Israel Democracy Institute, provides an overview of Israel's elections since the founding of the state, and of the political parties that participated in each. The information provided by party includes the parties' political platform, main leaders, the number of votes and Knesset seats won at each election, and their representation in government. The information on elections includes a description of the major issues that formed the backdrop to each, and the political context in which they were held. Additionally, full lists of candidates are provided, including those parties that did not reach the electoral threshold.

Comparative International Perspective 
This tool provides in-depth political information on 50 democratic countries, including Israel. This information includes basic data on each country (population, area, language), current leaders, system of government, electoral system, type of current government, and structure of legislative authority.

In addition, it allows users to view countries' rankings according to a number of comparative indexes, such as freedom of the press, perception of corruption, percentage of female members of parliament, GINI inequality index, and more. Users can compare multiple countries on a particular index, or compare multiple index rankings for a particular country.

Constitution by Consensus 
In 2001, the Israel Democracy Institute established the Constitution by Consensus public council, chaired by former Supreme Court President Meir Shamgar, with the aim of designing a constitution for Israel that would enjoy broad public support. The council had around 100 members, including ministers and Knesset members; secular, national religious, and Haredi Jews; Arabs; right-wingers and left-wingers; and academics, jurists, religious leaders, and public figures. Over the course of five years, this public council examined the diverse range of views relating to constitutional issues in Israel, and sought to formulate the agreements and compromises that would be necessary to create a consensual constitution. The council's discussions formed the basis and inspiration for the Israel Democracy Institute's proposal for a constitution by consensus.

Leadership 
IDI is headed by former MK Yohanan Plesner. Its leadership includes two vice presidents of Research: Prof. Mordechai Kremnitzer, Professor Emeritus of International Law at Hebrew University, and Prof. Yedidia Stern, a professor of law at Bar-Ilan University and former dean of its law school. Senior Research Fellows of the institute include Admiral Ami (Amichay) Ayalon, Professors Hanoch Dagan, Momi Dahan, Yuval Feldman, Tamar Hermann, Shahar Lifshitz, Yotam Margalit, Gideon Rahat, Eli Shaltiel, and Yuval Shany, and Doron H. Cohen. Past Senior Fellows include Prof. Avi Ben Bassat, Prof. Ruth Gavison, Adv. Dan Meridor, Prof. David Nachmias, Prof. Eyal Naveh, Prof. Aviezer Ravitzky, and Prof. Anita Shapira. The late Prof. Asher Arian headed the institute's program on political reform and directed its Guttman Center for Applied Social Research. In 2013, Dan Landau replaced Rabbi Itshak Levi as head of IDI's Policy Implementation division. Former U.S. Secretary of State George P. Shultz serves as the chairman of the institute's international advisory council. Amir Elstein is the chairman of the board. Rabbi Dr. Benjamin (Benny) Lau heads the institute's Human Rights and Judaism in Action project, which has published several contemporary responsa on people with disabilities and Jewish law.

In 2018, Yuval Shany was vice president for research.

Publications department 
The Israel Democracy Institute's publications department publishes books and policy studies written by the institute's research fellows, as well as proceedings of the conferences and study days organized by the institute. These publications aim to enrich Israeli public discourse about the issues of most importance for Israeli democracy. It also formerly published the online journal HaAyin HaShevi'it ("The 7th eye").

Published policy studies and books 
 From Victimhood to Sovereignty—An Analysis of the Victimization Discourse in Israel
 Religious? National!—The National-Religious Sector in Israel
 The Annual Statistical Report on Ultra-Orthodox Society in Israel
 Two Economies, One Society—A Publication of the Eli Hurvitz Conference on Economy and Society
 Theodore Herzl's Liberal Philosophy—How to Improve the Work of the Knesset
 NEET Among Young Arabs in Israel 
 A Master Plan for Ultra-Orthodox Employment in Israel
 The 2015 Israeli Elections
 The Arab Minority in Israel and the "Jewish State" Discourse
 Censorship and State Secrets in the Digital Age

Awards and recognition
In 2009, IDI was awarded the Israel Prize for its "lifetime achievement and special contribution to society and the State of Israel.

In the University of Pennsylvania's 2014 Global Go To Think Tanks Report, IDI was ranked the twenty-third best think thank in the Middle East and North Africa.

Budget 
The Israel Democracy Institute is funded by charitable donations, which totaled $8,989,254 in 2017. The institute's main funder is the Jewish-American billionaire Bernard Marcus.

The institute's budget is published yearly in its annual report.

See also
 List of Israel Prize recipients

References

External sources
 Official website
 Israel Democracy Institute Press Room
 

Civil rights organizations
Civil liberties advocacy groups
Israel Prize for lifetime achievement & special contribution to society recipients
Israel Prize recipients that are organizations
Liberalism in Israel
Non-profit organizations based in Israel
Organizations based in Jerusalem
Political and economic think tanks based in Israel
Think tanks established in 1991
Think tanks based in Israel
1991 establishments in Israel